Amara plebeja  is a species of ground beetle native to Europe.

Behavior and ecology

The habitat of A. plebeja has been observed to change during the species' life cycle: it reproduces in grass vegetation, and hibernates in deciduous trees. They fly between these habitats in spring and autumn.

References

External links
Amara plebeja (Gyllenhal, 1810) The Watford Coleoptera Group website

plebeja
Beetles described in 1810
Beetles of Europe